On 2 October 1990, a hijacked Boeing 737, operating Xiamen Airlines Flight 8301, collided with two other aircraft on the runways of the old Guangzhou Baiyun International Airport, while attempting to land. The hijacked aircraft struck parked China Southwest Airlines Flight 4305 first, inflicting only minor damage, but then collided with China Southern Airlines Flight 3523, a Boeing 757 waiting to take off, flipping onto its back. A total of 128 people were killed, including seven of nine crew members and 75 of 93 passengers on Flight 8301 and 46 of 110 passengers on Flight 3523.

Hijacking of Flight 8301
Xiamen Airlines Flight 8301, 
Boeing 737-200, was hijacked by Jiang Xiaofeng, born 11 August 1969 in Linli County, Hunan Province on Tuesday, 2 October 1990. Jiang, a 21-year-old purchasing agent from Hunan, People's Republic of China (PRC), was seeking political asylum in Taiwan.

Prior to the hijacking and shortly after the aircraft took off from Xiamen, Jiang approached the cockpit, holding flowers. The security guards let him in; a Time article stated that the guards probably let him through because they believed that Jiang was offering flowers to the pilots as a Moon Festival gift. The article stated that reportedly, once in the cockpit, he opened his jacket to reveal what appeared to be explosives strapped to his chest. The article added that Jiang ordered all crew members out of the cockpit, except for the pilot, Cen Longyu, whom he directed to fly to Taipei, Taiwan. The pilot did not comply, instead continuing toward the original destination of Guangzhou. Reports from the official Xinhua News Agency did not explain why the pilot did not accede to Jiang's demand.

Communication with the flight was lost. It was finally re-established by the airport in Guangzhou, which authorized the pilot to land at any airport available, inside or outside the PRC. The pilot stated that the only other airport that the aircraft still had sufficient fuel to reach was Hong Kong. Guangzhou flight controllers agreed to allow the plane to land in Hong Kong, refuel, and proceed to Taipei. Jiang refused to allow this, and threatened to blow up the aircraft if it landed in Hong Kong. The pilot circled Guangzhou, attempting to reason with Jiang. He was eventually forced to land the plane when it ran dangerously low on fuel.

Landing and collisions
Moments before landing, Jiang managed to wrestle control of the aircraft from the pilot. The 737 landed at an excessive speed, and sideswiped a parked China Southwest Airlines Boeing 707-3J6B which had just arrived from Chengdu as China Southwest Airlines Flight 4305, slightly injuring the pilot, who was in the cockpit at the time. Still unable to stop, the out-of-control 737 collided with China Southern Airlines Flight 3523, a Boeing 757 waiting to depart to Shanghai, before flipping over onto its back and skidding to a halt.

On the Xiamen Airlines 737, seven of the nine crew members and 75 (including 30 Taiwanese, three people from Hong Kong and one American) of the 93 passengers died. On the China Southern 757 aircraft all 12 crew members survived and 46 of 110 passengers died. Of the passengers who died in the 757, eight were from Taiwan. A total of 128 people died in the disaster, including Jiang, the hijacker of the Xiamen Airlines aircraft.

The hijacker 
Jiang was once arrested for theft in September 1988. While working as a purchasing agent in 1990, he fled on 13 July with RMB 17.000 which was given to him for purchasing goods for his company. He was wanted by the police at the time of the hijacking.

Two months later, on 29 September, Jiang checked-in at a hotel near the Xiamen borders. The next day, he booked a seat on the flight he would go on to hijack. Jiang checked out of the hotel around 6 a.m. on the morning of 2 October and headed to the airport. He was seen wearing a black suit and black dress shoes, carrying a black suitcase, and holding plastic roses. Jiang was the last to board the plane. He was sitting at seat 16D.

See also

 Ethiopian Airlines Flight 961

References

External links
 Flight Safety Foundation's Flight Safety Digest, December 1990—a brief about the incident is on Pages 13–14 (Archive)

1990 disasters in China
Mass murder in 1990
Airliner accidents and incidents involving ground collisions
Airliner accidents and incidents caused by hijacking
Aviation accidents and incidents in 1990
Aviation accidents and incidents in China
History of Guangzhou
Accidents and incidents involving the Boeing 707
Accidents and incidents involving the Boeing 737 Original
Accidents and incidents involving the Boeing 757
China Southern Airlines accidents and incidents
China Southwest Airlines accidents and incidents
XiamenAir accidents and incidents
October 1990 events in Asia
Cross-Strait relations
20th-century mass murder in China
Events in Guangzhou